USRC Louisiana, was a wood hull topsail schooner designed by William Doughty that was commissioned in the United States Revenue Marine from 1819 to 1824. Assigned the homeport of New Orleans, Louisiana, she sailed the Caribbean extensively and was used mainly in anti-piracy activity.

Construction
On 6 April 1819, the Collector of Customs at New York City was authorized by the Treasury Department to build two cutters, one to be stationed in Louisiana and the other to be stationed at Mobile, Alabama. The cutters were constructed by the Christian Bergh Shipyard at New York City using plans drawn up by naval constructor William Doughty. Doughty designed plans for 31-ton, 51-ton, and 80-ton cutters for the Revenue Marine. The Alabama-class cutters, consisting of Alabama and Louisiana were constructed on the 51-ton plan that measured  on deck, with a  beam, and a  depth of hold. Both were rigged as fore-topsail schooners with a square stern, raking masts, and light rails instead of heavy bulwarks. Both cutters were not armed initially, but were designed to accept a pivot gun amidships of a 9-pound to 18-pound capacity.

Service
After commissioning in New York City, Louisiana was assigned a homeport at New Orleans, Louisiana on 11 August 1819.

Capture of pirate schooner Bravo
While on her voyage to her homeport at New Orleans, on 31 August 1819, Louisiana assisted her sister ship, Alabama in the capture of the pirate vessel Bravo near Dry Tortugas. Bravo initiated the attack on Louisiana with a volley of musketry, during which the first officer and three crewmen were wounded.  The pirate ship was owned by Jean Lafitte and commanded by Jean Defarges, one of his lieutenants. Bravo had captured the Spanish schooner Filomena with a cargo of flour bound for Havana, Cuba out of Pensacola, Florida. The crew of Bravo were taken to New Orleans to await trial on charges of piracy while the passengers of Filomena were freed and returned to their ship.

Breton Island
On 19 April 1820, Louisiana and  Alabama raided the pirate operating base and stronghold on Breton Island. Both revenue cutters landed crewmen who burned buildings and woods. From Breton Island, both cutters continued westward searching for more pirate bases as part of a plan to eliminate piracy in the Gulf of Mexico. The presence of black prisoners suggested that the pirates were engaged in slave trade.

Later activity
On 18 September 1822, Louisiana assisted the sloop [[USS Peacock (1813)|USS Peacock]] and the British schooner HMS Speedwell with the capture of a pirate schooner in Cuban waters which was reclaimed for a payment of 1,000 in Havana by the vessel's lawful owners. Eighteen of the captured pirate crew members were sent to New Orleans for trial. Four more pirate vessels were captured by the trio of pirate hunters near Bahia Honda Key later in September, with two being burnt, and the other sent with prize crews to New Orleans. Eighteen of the captured pirate crew members were sent to New Orleans for trial.Record of Movements, p 77

In October 1822, Louisiana assisted in the capture of five pirate vessels of 80 to 100 tons each. Two were burnt, the others were sent to New Orleans with prize crews. Only one crew consisting of 17 men were taken to Camp Galvas near Pensacola, Florida; the rest of the vessel's crews managed to escape into the woods.

On 24 March 1824, the Collector of Customs at New Orleans ordered Louisiana'' sold. She was sold for 1,040.

Notes

Footnotes

Citations

References used

 
 
 
 
 

Ships of the United States Revenue Cutter Service
Ships of the United States Coast Guard
Ships built in New York City
Anti-piracy battles involving the United States
1819 ships